is the second cover album and third mini-album by Japanese soloist misono. The album was released only a few months after her last tribute album, Cover Album. The album charted at #44 on the Oricon Albums Charts and remained on the charts for two weeks.

For the melodies on the album (tracks #2 and #5), misono chose the songs to sing from Japanese bands Ulfuls and Judy and Mary.

Track listing
(via YesAsia)

Charts (Japan)

References

External links
Misono's Official Website

2010 compilation albums
Covers albums
Misono albums
Avex Group compilation albums